Vytautas Landsbergis-Žemkalnis (10 March 1893 – 21 May 1993) was a Lithuanian architect most active in interwar Lithuania (1926–1939). He was the father of Vytautas Landsbergis, the first Lithuanian head of state after independence from the Soviet Union.

Landsbergis's father, the playwright Gabrielius Landsbergis-Žemkalnis, was an active supporter of the Lithuanian National Revival. Landsbergis studied architecture at the Riga Polytechnical Institute. During World War I, he was drafted to the Imperial Russian Army and completed a school for junior officers. Upon return to Lithuania, he joined the newly established Lithuanian Army and fought in the Lithuanian Wars of Independence. He was taken prisoner by Poland, but managed to escape. He then continued his studies of architecture at the Higher School of Architecture in Rome (now a department of the Sapienza University). Landsbergis returned to Lithuania in 1926 and became one of the most popular and sought-after architects in Kaunas, the temporary capital of Lithuania. He was one of the leaders of a group of about 40 modernist architects working in Kaunas. Eight of his buildings were included in a group 44 buildings awarded the European Heritage Label in 2015. Overall, the modernist architecture of interwar Kaunas has been placed on the UNESCO World Heritage Tentative List in 2017.

When Nazi Germany invaded the Soviet Union and Lithuanians started the anti-Soviet June Uprising, Landsbergis became the minister of infrastructure in the short-lived Provisional Government of Lithuania. When his son  was arrested by the Gestapo in May 1944, Landsbergis followed his son from one prison to another until Gabrielius was freed by the Americans in April 1945. Landsbergis became a displaced person (DP) and taught at a Lithuanian DP camp and later at the University of the United Nations Relief and Rehabilitation Administration (UNRRA) in Munich. In 1949, he emigrated to Australia and worked there as an architect at the Housing and Construction Department in Melbourne. In 1959, he returned to Kaunas in Soviet Lithuania and worked as architect and restorer of monuments until retirement in 1984.

Biography

Early life and education
Landsbergis hailed from an old German Landsberg family that traced its roots to a ministerialis who lived in 1055 at the Werden Abbey. Landsbergis' father Gabrielius Landsbergis-Žemkalnis translated the name to Lithuanian and used Žemkalnis as his last name from around 1890.

The family supported the Lithuanian National Revival and their house was visited by various Lithuanian intellectuals, including Vincas Kudirka, Jonas Jablonskis, Pranas Mašiotas, Liudas Vaineikis, Antanas Kriščiukaitis, Jurgis Bielinis. In 1894, due to suspicions about his father's involvement in the Lithuanian book smuggling activities, the family was forced to leave Lithuania. Due to his Lithuanian activities, his father was imprisoned for ten weeks in Liepāja in 1900 and sentenced to two years of exile in Smolensk in 1902.

The family returned to Lithuania in 1904 and lived in Vilnius. Landsbergis attended Vilnius Real Gymnasium until 1908 when his cousin-in-law Pranas Mašiotas helped him transfer to Riga Gymnasium where he worked as a math teacher. After graduation in 1913, encouraged by Mašiotas, Landsbergis decided to study architecture at the Riga Polytechnical Institute. In 1915, during World War I, the institute was evacuated to Moscow.

Military service
Landsbergis was drafted to the Imperial Russian Army in 1916 and completed a school for junior officers. Due to disobedience, he was arrested and imprisoned until the October Revolution. 

Landsbergis returned to Lithuania in June 1918 and volunteered for the newly established Lithuanian Army. As an artillery captain, he participated in the Lithuanian Wars of Independence and saw action at Daugava River, Radviliškis, and Sejny. He was taken prisoner by Poland near Sejny and sent to a camp near Wadowice. Together with two other officers, Landsbergis escaped and returned to Lithuania via Czechoslovakia. For his military service, he was awarded the Order of the Cross of Vytis.

Interwar Lithuania
In April 1922, he left the army and took a technical job at the Ministry of Transport. One of his tasks was transporting Lithuanian gold reserves from Berlin. Together with poet  and future Minister of Foreign Affairs Juozas Urbšys, Landsbergis transported the gold in ordinary luggage. He felt the need for further education and attempted to study in Kaunas, Prague, Berlin, until he enrolled into the Higher School of Architecture in Rome (now a department of the Sapienza University) in January 1923. He received financial aid from the Žiburėlis Society. He completed his studies in December 1925 and received his diploma in July 1926. His diploma project was an eye clinic in the Alban Hills near Rome. The diploma was not recognized in Lithuania until 1932.

Landsbergis returned to Lithuania in 1926. His first project was a water tower in Kaišiadorys. He discovered that the initial winning architect was also a member of the judge panel; it caused a controversy and Landsbergis' work was eventually selected as the winner. Landsbergis became one of the most popular and sought-after architects in Kaunas, the temporary capital of Lithuania. At the same time, he took on many private clients. It was a profitable profession enabling Landsbergis to drive in a Chrysler automobile and construct a two-floor personal residence which also housed his wife's medical practice.

When Lithuania gained Vilnius as a result of the Soviet–Lithuanian Mutual Assistance Treaty in October 1939, Landsbergis became the chief engineer of Vilnius. He helped Balys Dvarionas organizing the Lithuanian National Symphony Orchestra in 1940 and prepared a project for a 1,200-seat opera and ballet theater (it was not constructed). After Lithuania was occupied by the Soviet Union in June 1940, Landsbergis became the chief architect of Vilnius. When Nazi Germany invaded the Soviet Union and Lithuanians started the anti-Soviet June Uprising, Landsbergis became the minister of infrastructure in the short-lived Provisional Government of Lithuania. He continued to work as chief of the city's construction board which prepared Vilnius' general plan in January 1944. During his tenure, the city began construction of a road to Kaunas as well as reconstruction of the Cathedral Square and the present-day Daukanto Square. These were not new initiatives, but a continuation of pre-war Polish projects. In 1942–1943, he also taught at Vilnius University.

Nazi occupation and emigration to Australia
There is some evidence that he was in contact with the anti-Nazi resistance (e.g. with Juozas Vitas). His wife  who remained in Kaunas helped hide 16-year old Jewish girl Bella Gurvich (later Rozenberg) and was recognized as one of the Righteous Among the Nations in 1995. (Youth, Stay Alert!). Gabrielius was arrested by the Gestapo in May 1944. Together with 26 other Lithuanians, some of them leaders of the Supreme Committee for the Liberation of Lithuania, he was transferred from one prison to another. Landsbergis followed his son's journey, smuggled him food, and petitioned Nazi officials (including Alfred Rosenberg, his acquaintance from the Riga Polytechnical Institute and the Reich Minister for the Occupied Eastern Territories). Gabrielius and other Lithuanian prisoners were eventually freed by the Americans in Bayreuth in April 1945. Landsbergis published a memoir about his efforts to free his son in 1991. 

In 1946–1949, he taught at the University of the United Nations Relief and Rehabilitation Administration (UNRRA) in Munich. In 1949, he emigrated to Australia and worked there as an architect at the Housing and Construction Department in Melbourne. Some of the projects he worked on include the embassy of Australia in New Delhi, hospital in Port Moresby (Papua New Guinea), government administrative building in Melbourne, tax office in Brisbane, factory for Burghart Hurle and Associates. He was also active with the Lithuanian Australian community.

Return to Soviet Lithuania
In 1959, he returned to Kaunas in Soviet Lithuania and worked as architect and restorer of monuments. From 1961 until retirement in 1984, he worked as an architect at the Institute for the Conservation of Monuments first in Kaunas and since 1970 in Vilnius. Many of the projects from this period remained unrealized. In 1966, Landsbergis donated his archives (more than 2,000 files) to the Lithuanian Archives of Literature and Art making one of the most comprehensive and complete architectural archives in Lithuania.

In 1973, for this 80th birthday, an exhibition was organized in his honor at the Arts Exhibition Palace and he was named the Honored Architect of the Lithuanian SSR. In 1991, he was recognized as the honorary citizen of Kaunas. In 1993, his 100th birthday was celebrated by the Lithuanian Union of Architects with a ceremony at the National Library of Lithuania and an exhibition at the Lithuanian Art Museum. The same year, Science and Encyclopedia Press published a monograph by Jolita Kančienė and Jonas Minkevičius about Landsbergis. Landsbergis died on 21 May 1993 in Vilnius and was buried in the Petrašiūnai Cemetery in Kaunas. In 1993, the former Architect Street in Eiguliai district of Kaunas was renamed in his honor. Another monograph about Landsbergis was published in 1997 by Algimantas Nakas. Another exhibition showcasing Landsbergis' works was organized in 2018.

Works

Landsbergis prepared over a hundred architectural projects. Many of his works are plain, without decoration, but expertly balancing proportions. He designed the buildings so that they would fit into their natural and architectural surroundings.

In 2015, 44 modernist buildings in Kaunas received the European Heritage Label. Of these buildings, eight were designed by Landsbergis:
 1928: residential house for painter Antanas Žmuidzinavičius
 1930: residential house for businessman Moze Chaimsonas (Maironis Street 13)
 1931: Apostolic Nunciature of the Holy See (present-day Kaunas Artists' House)
 1931: Physical Culture Palace (present-day Lithuanian Sports University) 
 1932–1936: Research Laboratory used by the Ministry of Defense (present-day Faculty of Chemical Technology of Kaunas University of Technology)
 1933: offices of the District Municipality (present-day Kaunas Police Headquarters)
 1937: Chamber of Commerce, Industry and Crafts (present-day Kaunas County Public Library) 

His other notable projects include:
 1927: 
 1928: Catholic Church of Christ the Redeemer in Kybartai (Romanesque Revival)
 1929: Eye, Ear, and Throat Clinic (present-day military hospital)
 1929: reconstruction of the Presidential Palace in Kaunas
 1930: reconstruction of Kaunas State Theatre
 1930: gymnasium in Biržai
 1931: gymnasium in Panevėžys
 1931: shelter for priests in Marijampolė
 1934: monument to pilots Steponas Darius and Stasys Girėnas at their crash site near Soldin and a mausoleum in present-day Ramybė Park
 1934: Catholic Church of St. John the Baptist in Šakiai
 1935: Catholic Church of the Sacred heart of Jesus in Mažeikiai
 1936: general plan for the Smeltė district in Klaipėda (132 houses and a trade school were constructed; plans for a Catholic church, market, and theater were interrupted by World War II)
 1937: Pedagogical Institute in Klaipėda
 1939: hospitals in Švėkšna and Šiauliai
 1961: reconstruction of a block in Vilnius Old Town (with others, the first such plan in post-war Vilnius, the exteriors would remain the same, but interiors would be significantly modernized)
 1975: reconstruction of the Old Arsenal of the Vilnius Castle Complex (with others)

In addition to public buildings, Landsbergis prepared projects for several private homes, some of them for the famous Lithuanians: writers Sofija Kymantaitė-Čiurlionienė (1932), Antanas Žukauskas-Vienuolis (1937), Pranas Mašiotas (1931), economist  (1930), and others.

References

1893 births
1993 deaths
Lithuanian architects
Lithuanian centenarians
Lithuanian people of German descent
20th-century architects
Lithuanian Army officers
Lithuanian prisoners of war
Men centenarians
Riga Technical University alumni
Academic staff of Vytautas Magnus University
Academic staff of Vilnius University
Lithuanian emigrants to Australia
Burials at Petrašiūnai Cemetery
Recipients of the Order of the Cross of Vytis
Vytautas, Landsbergis-Žemkalnis